The 2003-04 First Division season was the 26th of the amateur  competition of the first-tier football in Guinea-Bissau.  The tournament was organized by the Football Federation of Guinea-Bissau.  The season began on 27 December 2003 and finished on 17 June 2004, this was their next in two years.  SC Bissau won their eleventh title and finished with 39 points and to financial reasons did not qualify and competed in the 2005 CAF Champions League the following season.  Mavegro won the 2004 Guinea-Bissau Cup and did not participate in the 2005 CAF Confederation Cup the following season also to financial concerns.

Originally a 22 match season and would be 232 matches, instead as FC Bijagos and UDI Bissau withdrew and were excluded, an 18 match season took place and thus relegated to the second division in the following season.  Flamengo Bissau was last place with 13 points and the only club who competed relegated.

UDI Bissau was the defending team of the title. SC Bissau finished with 39 points.  Atlético Bissorã scored the most goals numbering 28.

Participating clubs

 Sporting Clube de Bissau
 Bula Futebol Clube - Promoted from the Second Division
 UDI Bissau
 Sport Bissau e Benfica
 Atlético Clube de Bissorã
 Futebol Clube de Bijagos

 Sporting Clube de Bafatá
 Futebol Clube de Cantchungo
 Mavegro Futebol Clube
 Flamengo Futebol Clube
 Estrela Negra de Bolama - Promoted from the Second Division
 CF Os Balantas

Overview
The league was contested by 10 teams with SC de Bissau winning the championship.

League standings

See also
Campeonato Nacional da Guiné-Bissau

Footnotes

External links
Historic results at rsssf.org

Guinea-Bissau
Football in Guinea-Bissau